Heterodeltis trichroa is a moth in the family Lecithoceridae. It was described by Edward Meyrick in 1906. It is found in Sri Lanka.

Description
The wingspan is about 14 mm. The forewings are dark brown, with the basal third dark purple fuscous. There is a triangular white blotch on the dorsum beyond one-fourth, reaching more than halfway across the wing and a cloudy ochreous-yellow dot on the costa before the middle, as well as a triangular ochreous-yellow patch extending along the costa from the middle to four-fifths, and reaching more than halfway across the wing. The hindwings are rather dark fuscous, in males with a subdorsal furrow throughout, filled with very long expansible pale fuscous hairs.

References

Moths described in 1906
Lecithocerinae